Luis Fernando López Payan (born 20 December 1999) is a Mexican professional footballer who plays as a goalkeeper for Dorados.

Club career
López began his career with Águilas UAS, firstly in the youth system before making his first-team debut in the Tercera División de México in 2015. He soon joined Dorados de Sinaloa. In 2016, López was loaned to Tijuana Premier and subsequently made two appearances. He first appeared in the Dorados de Sinaloa's senior squad during the 2017–18 Ascenso MX season, being an unused substitute on four occasions in all competitions. On 10 January 2018, López made his professional debut in a Copa MX encounter with Correcaminos UAT. He made two further appearances in the 2017–18 Copa MX.

International career
In October 2018, López was called up to the under-20 squad for the 2018 CONCACAF U-20 Championship in the United States. He featured in matches against Saint Martin, Grenada and Panama. Diego Ramírez selected López for the 2019 FIFA U-20 World Cup.

Career statistics

References

External links

1999 births
Living people
Sportspeople from Culiacán
Mexican footballers
Mexico youth international footballers
Mexico under-20 international footballers
Association football goalkeepers
Tercera División de México players
Ascenso MX players
Dorados de Sinaloa footballers
Club Tijuana footballers